The 2019–20 Primera Divisió, also known as Lliga Multisegur Assegurances for sponsorship reasons, was the 25th season of top-tier football in Andorra. The season began on 15 September 2019 and concluded on 23 July 2020, with Inter Club d'Escaldes winning their first title.

FC Santa Coloma were the defending league champions.

After a four month delay due to the COVID-19 pandemic in Andorra, it was announced that the league would return on 5 July 2020 to finish the regular season and then proceed to the playoffs, which will be halved.

Teams
At the conclusion of the previous season, Lusitanos and Encamp were relegated. Atlètic Club d'Escaldes and Carroi replaced those two after being promoted from the Segona Divisió.

Regular season

League table

Results
The eight clubs will play each other three times for twenty–one matches each during this phase of the league.

Rounds 1–14

Rounds 15–21

Championship and relegation rounds
Regular season records are carried over to championship and relegation rounds. Clubs will play other clubs in their group once for three matches each.

Championship round

Relegation round

Primera Divisió play-offs
The seventh-placed team (third-placed in the relegation round) from the 2019–20 Primera Divisió and the runners-up from the 2019–20 Segona Divisió, played a relegation play-off for a place in the 2020–21 Primera Divisió. A two-legged play-off was supposed to be held on 25 and 28 July 2020, but was postponed due to a positive COVID-19 case within La Massana. As a result, the play-off was changed to a single match.

Season statistics

Regular season top goalscorers

Regular season top goalkeepers

See also
 2019–20 Segona Divisió
 2020 Copa Constitució

References

External links
   
 soccerway.com

Primera Divisió seasons
Andorra
Primera Divisio
Primeria Divisio, 2019-20